Hammou Haddaoui Khadir (born 1 September 1936) is a Moroccan wrestler. He competed in the men's Greco-Roman middleweight at the 1960 Summer Olympics.

References

External links
 

1936 births
Living people
Moroccan male sport wrestlers
Olympic wrestlers of Morocco
Wrestlers at the 1960 Summer Olympics